José Marante (27 February 1915 – 27 August 1993) was an Argentine footballer. He played in nine matches for the Argentina national football team from 1945 to 1947. He was also part of Argentina's squad for the 1946 South American Championship.

References

External links
 

1915 births
1993 deaths
Argentine footballers
Argentina international footballers
Association football defenders
Footballers from Buenos Aires
Boca Juniors footballers